Garland County is located in the U.S. state of Arkansas. As of the 2020 census, the population was 100,180. The county seat is Hot Springs.

Garland County comprises the Hot Springs, AR Metropolitan Statistical Area. The county includes Hot Springs National Park, the only national park in the state of Arkansas as well as the first property to be protected under federal legislation. A law was passed in 1832 supported by President Andrew Jackson to preserve this area, even before Arkansas was admitted as a state.

History
This area was occupied by the historic Natchitoches people, who frequented the hot springs for their healing powers. Their ancestors among regional indigenous peoples had been coming to this area for thousands of years before their time.

After acquiring the Louisiana Territory in 1803, which had been controlled by French and Spanish officials, President Thomas Jefferson requested William Dunbar, a planter and amateur scientist of Natchez, Mississippi, to explore this area. Dunbar led small group of a dozen soldiers and friend George Hunter, a chemist, to the Ouachita Mountains to report on the Indian tribes, minerals, and springs. They reached Hot Springs in December 1804, where they found a basic cabin used by visitors to the springs.

The first European-American settler was Jean Pierre Emanuel Prudhomme, a descendant of French colonists. An owner of a plantation at Red River, Prudhomme was suffering from illness and sought relief from the springs. In 1807 he built the first permanent European house by the springs, living here for two years. Isaac Cates and John Percival, two trappers from Alabama, joined him. Percival foresaw a great potential for the area and built log cabins in order to rent to visitors to the springs.

In 1828, Ludovicus Belding came with wife and children to visit the hot springs. After a few months they built a small hotel for the visitors of the springs.

In 1832 President Andrew Jackson signed legislation to protect the hot springs area for recreational use by American citizens as Hot Springs Reservation, the first time such action was taken. This was four years before Arkansas became a state, on June 15, 1836. A dispute among original settlers and their descendants over control of the property was settled by the US Supreme Court in 1877 in favor of the federal government. Hot Springs National Park was established in 1921 and is managed by the National Park Service.

Garland County is Arkansas' 68th county, formed during the Reconstruction era on April 5, 1873, from portions of Hot Spring, Montgomery, and Saline counties. It was named for Augustus H. Garland, eleventh governor of Arkansas. It is the only county in the United States with this name.

Geography

Major highways
 U.S. Highway 70
 U.S. Highway 270
 Highway 5
 Highway 7
 Highway 88

Adjacent counties
Perry County (north)
Saline County (east)
Hot Spring County (south)
Montgomery County (west)
Yell County (northwest)

National protected areas
 Hot Springs National Park
 Ouachita National Forest (part)

Demographics

2020 census

As of the 2020 United States census, there were 100,180 people, 41,743 households, and 26,006 families residing in the county.

2000 census
As of the 2000 United States Census, there were 88,068 people, 37,813 households, and 25,259 families residing in the county.  The population density was 130 people per square mile (50/km2). There were 44,953 housing units at an average density of 66 per square mile (26/km2). The racial makeup of the county was 88.85% White, 7.80% Black or African American, 0.61% Native American, 0.50% Asian, 0.03% Pacific Islander, 0.72% from other races, and 1.49% from two or more races.  2.56% of the population were Hispanic or Latino of any race.

There were 37,813 households, out of which 25.10% had children under the age of 18 living with them, 53.20% were married couples living together, 10.10% had a female householder with no husband present, and 33.20% were non-families. 28.80% of all households were made up of individuals, and 13.50% had someone living alone who was 65 years of age or older.  The average household size was 2.28 and the average family size was 2.78.

In the county, the population was spread out, with 21.30% under the age of 18, 7.30% from 18 to 24, 25.20% from 25 to 44, 25.10% from 45 to 64, and 21.20% who were 65 years of age or older.  The median age was 42 years. For every 100 females there were 94.40 males.  For every 100 females age 18 and over, there were 90.80 males.

The median income for a household in the county was $31,724, and the median income for a family was $38,079. Males had a median income of $28,117 versus $20,421 for females. The per capita income for the county was $18,631.  About 10.50% of families and 14.60% of the population were below the poverty line, including 22.70% of those under age 18 and 8.60% of those age 65 or over.

Communities

Cities
Hot Springs (county seat)
Mountain Pine

Towns
Fountain Lake
Lonsdale

Census-designated places
 Crystal Springs
 Hot Springs Village
 Lake Hamilton
 Pearcy
 Piney
 Rockwell

Unincorporated communities
Bear
Jessieville
Royal

Townships

Government and politics
Over the past few election cycles Garland County has trended heavily towards the GOP. The last Democrat to carry this county was Arkansas “favorite son” Bill Clinton in 1996.

See also
 List of lakes in Garland County, Arkansas
 National Register of Historic Places listings in Garland County, Arkansas

References

External links
Garland County government's website
Hot Springs, Arkansas Community Guides • What to do and where to find it in Hot Springs, Arkansas.
Garland County Sheriff's Department

 
1873 establishments in Arkansas
Populated places established in 1873